The New Zealand women's national cricket team toured Australia in February 1996. They first played against Australia in three One Day Internationals, which were to contest the Rose Bowl, with Australia winning the series 2–1. They then played Australia in a Test match, but the match was abandoned on the third day after just 7.5 overs played, with an exhibition 50-over match played on day four instead.

Squads

WODI Series

1st ODI

2nd ODI

3rd ODI

WTest Series

1st Test

Exhibition Match

References

External links
New Zealand Women tour of Australia 1995/96 from Cricinfo

Women's international cricket tours of Australia
1996 in Australian cricket
New Zealand women's national cricket team tours